Fred E. Hendershot Sr. (April 25, 1895 – October 11, 1977) was an American football player and coach. He served as the head football coach at Baldwin–Wallace College—now known as Baldwin Wallace University—in Berea, Ohio in 1919, compiling a record of 0–8. He also served as the school's head men's basketball coach during the 1919–20 season, tallying a mark of 5–13.

Head coaching record

Football

References

External links
 

1895 births
1977 deaths
American football ends
Baldwin Wallace Yellow Jackets football coaches
Baldwin Wallace Yellow Jackets men's basketball coaches
Basketball coaches from Michigan
Michigan Wolverines football players
People from Osceola County, Michigan
Players of American football from Michigan